Tisanibainepta is a genus of southeast Asian jumping spiders first described by Dmitri V. Logunov in 2020. It includes three newly described species and three split from Tisaniba with several distinctions, including the embolus shape and the median septum present on the epigynum.

Species
 it contains six species:
T. bijibijan (Zhang & Maddison, 2014) (type) – Malaysia (Borneo)
T. kubah (Zhang & Maddison, 2014) – Malaysia (Borneo)
T. pahang Logunov, 2020 – Malaysia (Peninsula)
T. palawan Logunov, 2020 – Philippines (Palawan)
T. selasi (Zhang & Maddison, 2014) – Malaysia (Borneo)
T. silvatica Logunov, 2020 – Philippines (Palawan)

See also
 Tisaniba
 List of Salticidae genera

References

Salticidae genera
Spiders of Asia